Birds are feathered, winged, bipedal, warm-blooded, egg-laying animals.

Birds may also refer to:

Literature
 The Birds (play), an ancient Greek play by Aristophanes
 The Birds (novel), a novel by Tarjei Vesaas
 "The Birds" (story), a 1952 story by Daphne du Maurier
 Birds, the magazine of the Royal Society for the Protection of Birds
 The Birds, a musical play by David Cerda and Pauline Pang

Film
 The Birds (film), a 1963 Alfred Hitchcock film

Music
 The Birds (band), a 1960s UK rhythm and blues band
 The Birds (Respighi) or Gli Uccelli, a suite for small orchestra by Ottorino Respighi

Albums
 Birds (Bic Runga album) (2005)
 Birds (North Sea Radio Orchestra album) (2008)
 Birds (Marius Neset album) (2013 album)

Songs
 "Birds" (Kate Nash song) (2007)
 "Birds" (Anouk song) (2013)
 "Birds" (Coldplay song) (2015)
 "Birds" (Imagine Dragons song) (2019)
 "Birds", a song by Deas Vail from Birds and Cages
 "Birds", a song by Neil Young from After the Gold Rush, later covered by Linda Ronstadt
 "Birds", a song by Menahan Street Band from Make the Road by Walking
 "Birds", a song by Quasi from Featuring "Birds"
 "Birds", a song by Emiliana Torini from Me and Armini
 "Birds", a 2013 song by Death Grips from Government Plates
 "Birds", a song by M83 from Dead Cities, Red Seas & Lost Ghosts
 "Birds", a song by Guided by Voices from English Little League
 "The Birds", a 2011 song by Elbow from Build a Rocket Boys!
 "The Birds Pt. 1" and "The Birds Pt.2", two songs by The Weeknd from Thursday

Places

United States
 Birds, Illinois, an unincorporated community
 Birds, Texas, a ghost town in Tarrant County, Texas

Sport
 Philadelphia Eagles or Birds, a National Football League team
 Baltimore Orioles or Birds, a Major League Baseball team

Other uses
 Birds (advertisement), a 2008 award-winning television commercial
 The Birds (sculpture)
 BIRDS Project, a multinational satellite program that started with Birds-1

See also
 Bird (disambiguation)
 Birdz (disambiguation)
 Byrd (disambiguation)
 Birds of Tokyo (disambiguation)
 Bird's Opening, a chess opening
 The Byrds, an American band from the 1960s
 Die Vögel (opera) (The Birds), by Walter Braunfels
 Gli Uccelli (The Birds), a suite for small orchestra by Ottorino Respighi